Operation Car Wash was a criminal investigation by the Federal Police of Brazil's Curitiba branch. It began in March 2014 and was initially headed by investigative judge Sérgio Moro, and in 2019 by Judge . It has resulted in more than a thousand warrants of various types.  According to the Operation Car Wash task force, investigations implicate administrative members of the state-owned oil company Petrobras, politicians from Brazil's largest parties (including presidents of the Republic), presidents of the Chamber of Deputies and the Federal Senate, state governors, and businessmen from large Brazilian companies. The Federal Police consider it the largest corruption investigation in the country's history. The taskforce was officially disbanded on 1 February 2021.

Originally a money laundering investigation, it expanded to cover allegations of corruption at Petrobras, where executives allegedly accepted bribes in return for awarding contracts to construction firms at inflated prices. The investigation is called "Operation Car Wash" because it was first uncovered at a car wash in Brasília. It has included more than a thousand warrants for search and seizure, temporary and preventive detention, and plea bargaining, against business figures and politicians in numerous parties. At least eleven other countries were involved, mostly in Latin America, and the Brazilian company Odebrecht was deeply implicated.

Investigators indicted and jailed some well-known politicians, including former presidents Fernando Collor de Mello, Michel Temer and Luiz Inácio Lula da Silva. The scandal interrupted the rule of the PT coalition that had started in 2003, thanks to the independence of the judiciary and public prosecuters, and freedom of the press. Documents leaked in June 2019 to Glenn Greenwald at The Intercept suggest that Moro may have been partial in his decisions, passing on "advice, investigative leads, and inside information to the prosecutors" to "prevent Lula's Workers' Party from winning" the 2018 Brazilian general election. Some jurisprudence authorities and experts in the world have reacted to the leaks by describing former president Lula as a political prisoner and calling for his release. Lula was ultimately released on 8 November 2019, and went on to win the 2022 Brazilian general election.

Investigation 
The initial accusation came from businessman Hermes Magnus in 2008, who reported an attempt to launder money through his company, Dunel Indústria e Comércio, a manufacturer of electronic components. Ensuing investigations culminated in the identification of four large criminal rings, headed by: , Alberto Youssef, and Raul Henrique Srour.

Investigation at first focused on the four black-market currency dealers and improper payments to Alberto Youssef by companies who had won contracts at Petrobras' Abreu and Lima refinery. Once he was charged, Costa agreed to provide evidence to the investigation. A newly adopted law introduced 'rewarded collaboration' a type of plea bargaining involving sentence reductions for defendants who cooperate in investigations. Costa's deposition showed which political parties controlled Petrobras.

It also led to a wave of arrests. Fernando Soares, also known as "Fernando Baiano," a businessman and lobbyist, was allegedly the connection between major Brazilian construction firms and the government formed by the Workers’ Party (PT) and Brazilian Democratic Movement (PMDB). After Costa and Soares, many others agreed to collaborate with the prosecution; between 2014 and February 2016, the Federal Public Prosecutor's Office filed 37 criminal charges against 179 people, mostly politicians and businessmen. In December 2017, nearly three hundred people had been accused of crimes in the scandal. After Marcelo Odebrecht, grandson of the company founder, was sentenced to 19 years in prison, he and other Odebrecht executives were, due to the sentence reduction incentives of the 'rewarded collaboration' law, willing to act as witnesses and to give information about the broader corruption scheme. Odebrecht had a secret branch used to make illegal payments in several Latin American countries, from Hugo Chávez in Venezuela to Ricardo Martinelli in Panama. Odebrecht was given fines totalling $2.6 billion by authorities of Brazil, Switzerland, and the United States after the company admitted bribing officials in twelve countries with some $788 million.

as well as politicians involved with Petrobras. Brazilian President Dilma Rousseff, who chaired the board of Petrobras from 2003 to 2010, denied knowledge of any wrongdoing. The Brazilian Supreme Court authorized the investigation of 48 current and former legislators, including former President Luiz Inácio Lula da Silva, in March 2016. Eduardo Cunha, president of the Chamber of Deputies from 2015 to 2016, was convicted of taking approximately $40 million in bribes and hiding funds in secret bank accounts and sentenced to 15 years in prison.

On 19 January 2017, a small plane carrying Supreme Court Justice Teori Zavascki crashed into the sea near the tourist city of Paraty in the state of Rio de Janeiro, killing the magistrate and four other people. Zavascki had been handling Operation Car Wash corruption trials.

A Miami Herald report noted in September 2017 that when Operation Car Wash began in 2014, fewer than 10,000 electronic monitoring bracelets were in use to enforce home detention sentences; by September 2017 the number had ballooned to more than 24,000.

Effect on Petrobras 

Petrobras delayed reporting its annual financial results for 2014, and in April 2015 released "audited financial statements" showing $2.1 billion in bribes and a total of almost $17 billion in write-downs due to graft and overvalued assets, which the company characterized as a "conservative" estimate. Had the report been delayed by another week, Petrobras bondholders would have had the right to demand early repayment. Petrobras also suspended dividend payments for 2015. Due in part to the impact of the scandal, as well as to its high debt burden and the low price of oil, Petrobras was also forced to cut capital expenditures and announced it would sell $13.7 billion in assets over the following two years.

The conviction of Aldemir Bendine, Petrobras' former CEO, on corruption charges was annulled by the Supreme Federal Court in 2019 due to objections to the trial procedure.

Domestic politics 

 The treasurer of the Workers' Party (PT), João Vaccari Neto, was arrested for receiving "irregular donations".
 The former chief of staff for President Lula, José Dirceu, was arrested for organising a large part of the bribery.
 The President of the Chamber of Deputies, Eduardo Cunha (PMDB-RJ), investigated for receiving more than US$40 million in kickbacks and bribes.
 Former president and current Senator Fernando Collor de Mello, of the Christian-conservative Christian Labour Party (PTC), was charged with corruption.

On 8 March 2016, Marcelo Odebrecht, CEO of Odebrecht and grandson of the company's founder, was sentenced to 19 years in prison after being convicted of paying more than $30 million in bribes to Petrobras executives.

In April 2018, former president Luiz Inácio Lula da Silva – after having been sentenced for passive corruption and money laundering in relation to a luxury apartment in Guarujá received from Grupo OAS – entered prison in Curitiba to serve his 12 year sentence. However, illegal communications between Car Wash prosecutors and its lead judge came to light in mid-2019, in which the parties suggested that their prosecutorial motive was to prevent Lula's re-election. There were calls to release the former president (see Leaked conversations below). As a result, he was released on 8 November 2019 after a supreme court ruling.

On 3 July 2018, failed Brazilian billionaire Eike Batista was convicted of bribing former Rio de Janeiro governor Sérgio Cabral for state government contracts, having paid Cabral US$16.6 million, and was sentenced to 30 years imprisonment.

Political parties

Lula and the Worker's Party 

Emílio Odebrecht said in a written report to the Attorney General of Brazil's Office (PGR) that he discussed donations to Worker's Party's (PT) campaigns with former PT president Lula. Financial support, according to the contractor, came even before Lula became president. Marcelo Odebrecht said that the "Amigo" account for former President Luiz Inacio Lula da Silva, was created in 2010 with a balance of R$40 million. In his statement, he said he gave the money to Antonio Palocci, former Finance Minister and Rousseff's chief of staff, who had been the PT contact with Odebrecht since the prior administration, when  and Pedro Novis had handled payments. He said that in the middle of 2010, at the end of the Lula administration, he knew that Dilma Rousseff was going to take over and that the balance of the account would be "managed by her at her request". Thus, he set apart a sum that would be destined exclusively for the former president. He said that Lula never asked directly for donations and that everything was done through Palocci, but it became clear that the donations were ultimately for the former president.

On 4 March 2016, Lula was questioned for three hours as part of the fraud inquiry into the dealings of Petrobras, and his house raided by federal police agents. Lula, who left office in 2011, denied allegations of corruption. Police said they had evidence that Lula, 70, had received kickbacks. Lula's institute called actions against him "arbitrary, illegal and unjustifiable", since he had been cooperating with the investigations. Lula, convicted of accepting bribes worth 3.7 million reals (1.2 million dollars), was sentenced on 12 July to nine and a half years in prison. He appealed the sentence to the Federal Regional Court-4, which increased his sentence to twelve years and a month. On 5 April 2018, Moro ordered his imprisonment, and he surrendered two days later.

Temer and Brazilian Democratic Movement 

The plea bargain testimony by Odebrecht Engenharia Industrial's former president Márcio Faria da Silva said that on 15 July 2010, President Michel Temer led a meeting about an agreement to pay approximately US$40 million in bribes to the Brazilian Democratic Movement in exchange for contracts with the international Board of Directors of Petrobras. According to Faria, Temer, who at the time was a candidate for vice-president on Dilma Rousseff's ticket, delegated to Eduardo Cunha and Henrique Eduardo Alves, then deputies and present at the meeting, the task of making the payments which represented 5% of the contract's value. The meeting took place in Temer's political office in São Paulo. He did not discuss any details about the financial agreement, limiting himself to trivial conversations about politics.

Aécio and Brazilian Social Democracy Party 

Marcelo Odebrecht said in his plea bargain testimony that the Social Democratic (PSDB) party, led by Senator Aécio Neves (PSDB-MG), received at least 50 million reals in exchange for favoring the business contractor in energy deals. He said that improper payments were made due to business deals with two state companies: Furnas and Cemig. The second state-run investigation was influenced by Aécio during the period when the PSDB was in power in Minas Gerais (2003–2014).

Political families 
Odebrecht also discussed family involvement. In eleven cases under the jurisdiction of the Supreme Federal Court (STF), investigations implicate father and son, husband and wife, or siblings. The president of the Chamber, Rodrigo Maia (DEM-RJ), has the most family members implicated. Maia was charged in the same investigation as his father, councilor and former mayor Cesar Maia. According to the Odebrecht testimony, Rodrigo obtained cash resources both for his father's campaign and also for himself. The Brazilian Democratic Movement leader of the Senate, Renan Calheiros (AL), was charged along with his son, the governor of Alagoas Renan Filho (PMDB), in two inquiries. They allegedly participated in an agreement to divert resources from work on the Canal do Sertão and also received resources in the form of a slush fund they refer to as a caixa 2. In the case of the father, two other inquiries are ongoing.

The governor of Rio Grande do Norte, Robinson Faria (PSD), was charged along with his son, federal deputy Fábio Faria (PSD-RN). The two allegedly received contributions through a slush fund in return for defending Odebrecht Ambiental's interests in the area of basic sanitation in the state. The president of the PMDB, Senator Romero Jucá (RR), and his son Rodrigo Jucá both figured in one of the inquiries. The father helped Odebrecht negotiate a provisional measure and obtained an electoral donation of 150,000 reals for his son. Romero Jucá was also charged in four other inquiries. The father was able to raise the money for Zeca in exchange for the acting for Odebrecht interests in the government.

Senator Kátia Abreu (PMDB-TO) was accompanied by her husband Moisés Pinto Gomes, who brokered cash payments for her in 2014. Senator Vanessa Grazziotin (PCdoB-AM) is accompanied by her husband, said to have asked for slush fund cash donations for her. Federal Deputy  (PT-SC) also requested slush funds for the Blumenau municipal campaign in 2012 of his wife, state deputy Ana Paula Lima (PT-SC). The Viana brothers of Acre, Governor Tião Viana (PT) and Senator Jorge Viana (PT), were also charged together. Jorge asked for and Odebrecht paid R$1.5 million in cash two for Tião's campaign in 2010.

Politicians and public figures implicated

Payments to Brazilian senators 
The names of the senators cited in the report were:

Payments to federal deputies 
The names of the federal deputies cited in the Odebrecht statement were:

Other Brazilian public figures 
The names in the Odebrecht statement include other politicians and former public officials:

Dilma Rousseff's 2014 presidential campaign 

Marcelo Odebrecht detailed the payment of 100 million reals for the 2014 presidential campaign of Rousseff, requested by then-minister Guido Mantega. The payment was allegedly tied to the approval of Provisional Measure 613, which assisted Braskem, an arm of Odebrecht, and dealt with the Special Chemical Industry Regime (Reiq), and tax incentives to stimulate ethanol production. The former executive said he often met Mantega and they both brought their lawsuits to meetings. According to him, the former minister had already asked the executive to "resolve issues" pending with publicist João Santana and the then-treasurer of the PT, . The advertiser always feared political campaigns because of the risk of getting into debt at the end. That's why he made advance payment on the account, to make it quiet.

Former Odebrecht Institutional Relations Director  stated that former minister , when he became treasurer of Dilma Rousseff's campaign in 2014, asked for two donations from five parties to support the Force of the People, at 7 million reals each. The PCdoB, PDT, PRB, PROS, and PP received the illegal donations, according to the former director of Odebrecht. Together, these parties gave three minutes and twenty seconds of television time to the presidential ticket. In return, said the former director, the contractor hoped to obtain quid pro quos from the elected government. The informant detailed meetings with the politicians in his office and cash deliveries, always made in kind by messengers to hotel rooms or flats. Marcelo Odebrecht said he met with Silva a few times to handle the money for the parties that would join the coalition in 2014. The former Dilma minister allegedly instructed Alencar to directly seek party leaders to pass on the values. He clarified that the interest of the PT was the increase of the time of electoral time in the television, being in a total of eleven minutes and twenty-four seconds, being a third of that time coming from the parties purchased.

Repercussions outside Brazil 

During the many years it has been going on, the Car Wash scandal has expanded from its original roots in money laundering, to encompass wider corruption in Brazil, and outside its borders in at least ten other countries, even beyond South America.

Paradise Papers 

On 5 November 2017, the Paradise Papers, a set of confidential electronic documents relating to offshore investment, revealed that Odebrecht used at least one offshore company as a vehicle for paying the bribes uncovered through the Operation Car Wash investigation. Marcelo Odebrecht, his father Emílio Odebrecht and his brother Maurício Odebrecht are all mentioned in the Paradise Papers.

Argentina 
During the governments of Cristina Fernández de Kirchner and Néstor Kirchner, Odebrecht was awarded overvalued contracts worth at least US$9.6 billion.

Mexico 
In Mexico, the former director of the state-owned oil company Pemex, a close ally of President Peña Nieto, is suspected of receiving US$10 million in bribes from Odebrecht.

Panama 
Ramón Fonseca Mora, president of Panama's Panameñista Party, was dismissed in March 2016 due to his involvement in the scandal. The Panama Papers resulted from a hack of his lawfirm's computer systems.

Fonseca and his business partner Jürgen Mossack were arrested and jailed in February 2017. They were released in April 2017 after a judge ruled they had cooperated with the investigation and ordered them each to pay $500,000 in bail.

Peru 
During the Peruvian presidential election in February 2016, a report by the Brazilian Federal Police implicated President Ollanta Humala in bribery by Odebrecht for public works contracts. President Humala denied the charge and has avoided questions from the media on this matter. In July 2017, Humala and his wife were arrested and held in pre-trial detention following investigations into his involvement in the Odebrecht scandal. Investigations revealed that Brazilian president Lula da Silva pressured Odebrecht to pay millions of dollars toward Humala's presidential campaign.

In December 2017 Peru's President Pedro Pablo Kuczynski appeared before Congress to defend himself against impeachment over allegations of covering up illegal payments of $782,000 from Odebrecht to Kuczynski's company Westfield Group Capital Ltd. Keiko Fujimori, who had lost the 2016 presidential elections to Kuczynski by a margin of fewer than 50,000 votes, was championing impeachment; her party had already forced out five government ministers. Fujimori herself was later implicated in the Odebrecht scandal over alleged campaign contributions and on 31 October 2018 a judge sent her to 36 months of pretrial detention. Kuczynski resigned the Presidency on 21 March 2018 and was sent to pretrial detention on 10 April 2019.

On 17 April 2019, Alan García, a former President of Peru who was also implicated in the scandal, died by suicide from shooting himself in the head while police attempted to arrest him.

Former president Alejandro Toledo (2001–2006) was also implicated in the bribery scandal, and was arrested in Redwood City, California in July 2019 for allegedly taking bribes in connection with a highway construction contract.

Venezuela 
In late 2017, Euzenando Prazeres de Azevedo, president of Constructora Odebrecht in Venezuela, told investigators that Odebrecht had made $35 million in campaign contributions to Nicolas Maduro's 2013 presidential campaign in return for Odebrecht projects receiving priority in Venezuela, that Americo Mata, Maduro's campaign manager, initially asked for $50 million for Maduro, settled in the end for $35 million. In May 2018, Transparency International showed that only 9 of 33 projects started by Odebrecht in Venezuela between 1999 and 2013 were completed.

Singapore 
One of Singapore's prominent government linked company (Keppel Corp) is also implicated in the Petrobras' corruption scandals. Information of involvement is confirmed in the plea bargain Keppel Corporation reached with US DOJ. Keppel and US DOJ however failed to release the name of all people involved in this corruption scandal. Details is available on the US DOJ site here.

Leaked conversations 

On 9 June 2019, Glenn Greenwald and other journalists from investigative journalism magazine The Intercept Brasil started publishing several leaked chat messages exchanged via the Telegram app between members of the Brazilian judiciary system. Some, including then Car Wash judge and former Minister of Justice Sérgio Moro and lead prosecutor Deltan Dallagnol are accused of violating legal procedure during the investigation, trial and arrest of former president Luiz Inácio Lula da Silva allegedly for the sake of preventing him to run for a third term in the 2018 Brazilian general election, among other crimes. Other news agencies, such as Folha de São Paulo and Veja confirmed the authenticity of the messages and worked in partnership with The Intercept Brasil to sort the rest of the material in their possession before releasing it.

On 23 July, Brazilian Federal Police made public that they had arrested and were investigating a hacker from Araraquara, Walter Delgatti Neto, for breaking into the authorities' Telegram accounts. Neto confessed to the hack and to having given the chat logs to Greenwald. Police said the attack had been perpetrated by abusing Telegram's phone number verification and exploiting vulnerabilities in voicemail technology in use in Brazil using a spoofed phone number. The Intercept neither confirmed nor denied that Neto was their source and cited provisions for freedom of the press in the 1988 Brazilian Constitution.

Greenwald has faced death threats and homophobic harassment from supporters of President Jair Bolsonaro due to his reporting on the Telegram messages. A New York Times profile of Greenwald and his husband David Miranda, a left-wing congressman, said the couple have become targets of homophobia from Bolsonaro supporters as a result of the reporting. The Washington Post reported that Greenwald had been targeted with tax investigations by the Bolsonaro government as retaliation for the reporting, while AP called Greenwald's reporting the first test case for a free press in the Bolsonaro era.

The Guardian, reporting on retaliation against Greenwald from the Bolsonaro government and its supporters, said the articles published by Greenwald and The Intercept "have had an explosive impact on Brazilian politics and dominated headlines for weeks," adding that the exposés "appeared to show prosecutors in the sweeping Operation Car Wash corruption inquiry colluding with Sérgio Moro, the judge who became a hero in Brazil for jailing powerful businessmen, middlemen and politicians."

After Bolsonaro explicitly threatened to imprison Greenwald for this reporting, Supreme Court justice Gilmar Mendes ruled that any investigation of Greenwald in connection with the reporting would be illegal under Brazilian constitution, calling freedom of the press a "pillar of democracy".

Greenwald reported that the leaked file is bigger than the one in the Snowden case. Fernando Haddad considered the leaks to have potential to become the "greatest institutional scandal in the history of the Brazilian republic".

In response to the leaks, several top jurisprudence authorities and experts in Europe and the Americas, such as Susan Rose-Ackerman (praised by Car Wash prosecutor Deltan Dallagnol as the world's top corruption expert), Bruce Ackerman, and Luigi Ferrajoli, voiced their shock at the conduct of the Brazilian authorities and described former President Lula as a political prisoner, calling for his release.

In March 2020, the Intercept reported that Brazilian prosecutors had secretly collaborated with the US Department of Justice and Federal Bureau of Investigation in a manner "that may have violated international legal treaties and Brazilian law". The Brazilian Ministry of Justice had not been informed; making this collaboration illegal. They also found that money paid by Brazilian companies in the US were funnelled back into Brazil; chief prosecutor Deltan Dallagnol said he would use part of this sum to set up an "independent fund to fight corruption". This attempt was then deemed unconstitutional by Brazil's Supreme Court. It was reported that Mr. Dallagnol had called Lula da Silva's arrest “a gift from the CIA”. Leslie Backschies, the head of the US FBI’s international corruption unit, alluded to this incident when discussing the sensitivity of anti-corruption investigations in a 2019 interview with AP news saying  “We saw presidents toppled in Brazil”.

Winding down 
As of September 2020, there were fears that political forces were about to bring an end to Operation Car Wash, according to prosecutors in Brazil.  Chief prosecutor Deltan Dallagnol said, "Today there is a very strong alignment of political forces against the Lava Jato operation. Much more than [just] an operation, the Brazilian effort against corruption itself is at risk."  One of the reasons Jair Bolsonaro was elected president in 2018, was because of his promises to attack corruption, but since he and his family members became embroiled, he has cooled on it. Bolsonaro's attorney general Augusto Aras complained that the investigations went too far, and were biased politically, and campaigned against it, gaining support from Bolsonaro family members such as son Flavio who was caught up in it. Dallagnol claimed that the slow down and efforts to stop the investigations were because the investigations were getting close to revealing corruption at the highest levels. Other branches of government also oppose the investigations, including Congress and the Supreme Court, which have been targets, as well as political parties.  Analysts see a concerted effort to back down from aggressive anti-corruption efforts in Brazil.

Dramatizations 
There are two dramatizations of Operation Car Wash. One is the 2017 film Polícia Federal: A Lei É para Todos (Federal Police: The Law Is for Everyone), directed by Marcelo Antunez (2017), and the other is the Netflix series The Mechanism.

See also 
 Brazilian Anti-Corruption Act
 Impeachment of Dilma Rousseff
 Impeachment proposals against Michel Temer
 List of scandals in Brazil
 Mani pulite, Italian judicial investigation into political corruption
 Odebrecht–Car Wash leniency agreement
 Offshoots of Operation Car Wash
 Phases of Operation Car Wash
 Odebrecht Case
 in Portuguese:
 Desdobramentos da Operação Lava Jato fora do Brasil (Offshoots of Operation Car Wash outside Brazil)

References
Notes

Citations

External links 

 Lava Jato  official Brazilian website for Operation Car Wash
 Constitution of the Federative Republic of Brazil  pdf; 432 pages
 Legislação brasileira traduzida para o Inglês official English translations of the Constitution, and dozens of other laws

2014 in Brazil
2014 scandals
2015 in Brazil
2015 scandals
2016 in Brazil
2016 scandals
2017 in Brazil
2017 scandals
Anti-corruption measures
Corruption in Brazil
Government of Michel Temer
Odebrecht
Petrobras
Political history of Brazil
Political scandals in Brazil